Ophiusa cancellata is a moth of the family Erebidae. It is found in subtropical Africa, and it is known from Uganda, the Democratic Republic of the Congo, Madagascar and Zambia.

It looks similar to Ophiusa melaconisia but with yellow rear wings, wingspan is 40–44 mm.

References

Ophiusa
Moths described in 1891
Moths of Madagascar
Insects of Uganda
Moths of Africa